Morning Glories is a comic book series published by Image Comics. Described by writer Nick Spencer as "Runaways meets Lost," the series focuses on six "brilliant but troubled" new recruits at Morning Glory Academy, a prestigious prep school hiding "sinister and deadly" secrets. Featuring interior art by Joe Eisma and cover art by Rodin Esquejo, the series debuted in August 2010.

Publication history
Though sharing qualities with other long form, high-concept mysteries, writer Spencer points out that Morning Glories was launched with a planned run of about 100 issues and a definite ending, culminating in a final series run of fifty issues. The first pages of the debut, Spencer says, will "completely prove that we knew what we were doing from the get go." The series found commercial success from its inception, with four printings of the first issue alone.  The first volume of the trade paperback edition (containing issues 1–6) sold 10,000 copies in a month. Critical success is abundant as well, with IGN calling the first issue "one of the most engrossing...in recent memory" and noting that Spencer is "determined to make the rest of the comic book world stand up and take notice."

The first 50 issues are split into two "seasons", with the first encompassing volumes 1–4 (For a Better Future to Truants) and the second, volumes 5–10 (Tests to Expulsion). The third season, titled Summer Vacation, was expected to be released in Winter 2016 or early 2017. Although it is a continuation of the story, it is planned for Summer Vacation to launch as a new issue #1.

Responding to a question on his Tumblr page in December 2017, Eisma stated that he is in semi-regular contact with Spencer but has been given no indication of a start date for work on the third season before adding that he is anxious to continue working on the series as soon as he receives the first script.

Premise
The series takes place almost completely at the fictional Morning Glory Academy, an exclusive boarding school for teenagers.  Beneath its placid facade, the school is actually involved in the murder and torture of students as well as various investigations into occult and supernatural phenomena.  The main action focuses on six students from diverse backgrounds as they enter Morning Glory Academy, try to survive and fight back against the ruthless faculty.

The series is written using a nonlinear narrative, frequently utilising flashbacks or flash-forwards to confuse, misdirect and inform the reader. Prominent recurring themes include religion, philosophy, science, identity, power, death and authoritarianism. The series also includes science fiction elements, primarily time-travel.

Characters
See: List of Morning Glories Characters for more information.

The story initially centres on six new Morning Glory Academy students: Casey, Zoe, Hunter, Jun, Jade, and Ike, focusing on their early lives with their families as well as their interactions with each other and the school's faculty: Miss Daramount, Mr Gribbs, Miss Dagney, Miss Hodge and Nurse Nine. The villainous Headmaster of the Academy is frequently mentioned but is not seen until issue #50.

As the series progresses, a new significant group of students referred to as the Truants are introduced. Made up of Irina, Guillaume, Vanessa, Ian, Fortunato and Akiko, they are a diverse group of children loyal to Abraham, a man with a connection to the Academy and each of the Glories. The Truants play a pivotal role in the latter half of season one and continue to be important characters during the second season.

In season two, the A.V. Club, a collection of students with the goal of exposing the truth about the Academy through non-violent means, are introduced after they befriend Hunter in issue #31. They are composed of Esi, Andres and Hannah.

Story arcs

Season One

Season Two

Collected editions
The series has been released in trade paperbacks (TPB) and "Deluxe Edition" hardcovers (HC). Detailed information of the releases is listed below.

References

2010 comics debuts
Image Comics titles
Image Comics teams